Eric Robertson Cullen (12 July 1965 – 16 August 1996) was a Scottish actor, who was famous for his role as Wee Burney in BBC's Rab C. Nesbitt. Cullen was born with achondroplasiaa type of dwarfism.

Early life
He was born to a single mother and was adopted by a family from Hamilton.  He was diagnosed with achondroplasia at the age of seven.

Acting career
Cullen began acting when he was at school. He started to find roles appearing in several theatre groups before appearing in several Scottish TV programmes in the 1980s, particularly A Kick Up the Eighties. Cullen eventually found lasting fame playing the youngest son, Wee Burney, in the first three series of Rab C. Nesbitt. However, he left the programme in December 1993; owing to personal problems and citing ill health.

Victim of abuse
Cullen was sexually abused by a violent paedophile ring from the age of thirteen, and since his condition meant that he looked much younger than he was, this abuse continued into his twenties. Once he became a successful actor, his abusers returned to extort money with menaces. As a result, he developed clinical depression and post traumatic stress disorder.

Child campaigner
Cullen was arrested in 1993 for possession of child pornography, and the subsequent police investigation and press coverage resulted in clinical depression when he "finally cracked under a load which had become unbearable". In 1995, Cullen was convicted of child pornography offences, and his own history of being sexually abused since the age of 13 was revealed. His nine-month prison sentence was reduced to three years' probation on appeal. As soon as his prison sentence had been quashed on appeal, he began to be offered acting parts again, but he was still too ill with severe post traumatic stress disorder to resume work.

Once the court case was out of the way Cullen dedicated himself to campaigning against child pornography, and to trying to bring his abusers to justice. Of the three men he named as his principal abusers one, Francis Currens, was jailed during Cullen's lifetime; one, Cullen's uncle Jack Williams, was jailed after his death (both of them for sexual offences including the repeated rape of young boys); and as of summer 2006 one, whom Cullen named as the ringleader, has never been prosecuted.

Death
Only a day or two before his fatal heart attack, which followed on from surgery for a twisted bowel, he had been asked to take up the role of Wee Burney again. He was however in two minds as to whether to resume his acting career or become a clinical psychologist specialising in the treatment of abuse victims; he already had a BA in psychology, and had been accepted to begin a more advanced course in forensic psychology that autumn.

Acting career
 Huntingtower
 Playfair
 The Camerons
 Govan Ghost Story
 Deathwatch
 A Kick Up the Eighties
 Laugh??? I Nearly Paid My Licence Fee
 Scotch & Wry
  Out With the Old (1993) (STV's Hogmanay Show) Rab C Nesbitt''

References

External links
 
 "Wee Burney - The Vile Truth" - 2000 Sunday Mail article which reports a claim that although Eric Cullen "was the victim of horrific and sustained abuse" he "crossed the line and became an abuser himself".

1965 births
1996 deaths
Actors with dwarfism
Scottish male television actors
Scottish male comedians
20th-century Scottish male actors
20th-century British comedians